Roman Franciszek Strzałkowski (6 October 1941 – 5 March 1977) was a Polish international footballer who played as a centre half. He signed for Scottish club Hamilton Academical in June 1971, alongside fellow Polish internationals Alfred Olek and Witold Szygula. They were "the first players from behind the Iron Curtain […] to play in Britain." The deal was orchestrated by Hamilton's chairman Jan Stepek, who was himself Polish, in return for electronic goods being sent to Poland. Strzałkowski also played in Poland for Zagłębie and Szombierki Bytom.

References

External links

1941 births
1977 deaths
Sportspeople from Bytom
Polish footballers
Poland international footballers
Hamilton Academical F.C. players
Szombierki Bytom players
Scottish Football League players
Association football defenders
Polish expatriate footballers
Polish expatriate sportspeople in Scotland
Expatriate footballers in Scotland
Place of birth missing
Ekstraklasa players
Zagłębie Sosnowiec players